Cambrian Airways was an airline based in the United Kingdom which ran operations from Cardiff Airport and Liverpool John Lennon Airport between 1935 and 1974. It was incorporated into British Airways when BOAC, BEA, Cambrian and Northeast merged on 1 April 1974.

History
Cambrian was set up on 25 April 1935 as Cambrian Air Services. The airline's base was at Pengam Moors airfield located to the east of Cardiff. The first aircraft to be operated was a single de Havilland DH.60 Moth, with the main activity of training pilots, and flights for tourists.  With the outbreak of World War II, Cambrian stopped its activities.

Commencing on 1 January 1946 it was the first British airline to restart operations after the war, with a charter flight with an Auster Autocrat with a cargo of wire rope and an aircraft seat between Cardiff airport and Bristol. In 1948 Cambrian was flying in cooperation with BEA and used the de Havilland Dragon Rapide, the Autocrat and the Percival Proctor. During 1949 flights between Birmingham and Jersey were begun. During 1953, Cambrian took over Olley Air Service and Murray Chown Aviation and began services between Southampton to Dinard and Paris. This route was served with the de Havilland Dove and later with the Douglas DC-3. In 1956 the name was changed to Cambrian Airways.

Later history
By 1961, Cambrian was operating eight ex BEA Douglas Dakota (DC-3) airliners. The first service operated by the Vickers Viscount turboprop commenced on 20 February 1963 on the route from Cardiff via Bristol to Dublin. From 1964 the type was used on charter flights to Rimini, Palma, Nice, Valencia and Barcelona.  In 1967 BEA took over Cambrian, although it continued to operate as a separate airline.  The following year the last flight with the DC-3 was flown . Cambrian also operated jet aircraft in the form of the BAC One-Eleven, which were used for charter flights in addition to operation on the scheduled network.

In 1972 Cambrian was incorporated into the new British Air Services group and gradually lost more and more of its independence. On 1 April 1974, Cambrian was one of the four component companies merged to form British Airways and the Cambrian colour scheme was gradually replaced by an interim scheme with British Airways as the name and Cambrian in much smaller text then the full BA colour scheme,

Destinations in 1971

According to its 1 November 1971 system timetable, Cambrian was serving the following destinations with scheduled passenger flights:

United Kingdom

 Belfast
 Bristol
 Bournemouth
 Cardiff
 Edinburgh
 Glasgow
 Guernsey
 Isle of Man
 Jersey
 Liverpool
 London - Heathrow Airport
 Manchester
 Southampton

Ireland

 Cork
 Dublin

France

 Paris - Le Bourget Airport

The above referenced timetable also states the Cambrian fleet consisted of four (4) BAC One-Eleven jet aircraft and eight (8) Vickers Viscount turboprop aircraft at this time.

Fleet
 British Aircraft Corporation BAC One-Eleven 400
 de Havilland Dragon Rapide
 de Havilland Dove
 de Havilland Heron
 Douglas DC-3
 Vickers Viscount 701
 Vickers Viscount 806X

Accidents and incidents
On 20 July 1965, Vickers Viscount G-AMOL crashed on landing at Speke Airport, Liverpool after a flight from Ronaldsway Airport, Isle of Man. Both crew were killed, as well as two persons on the ground.
On 19 January 1970, Vickers Viscount G-AMOA was damaged beyond economic repair in a heavy landing at Lulsgate Airport, Bristol.

See also
 List of defunct airlines of the United Kingdom

References

March, P.R. and A.J. Wright. "Airline History No. 26: Cambrian". Air Pictorial, March 1972. pp. 100–104.
Merton-Jones, A.C. British Independent Airlines 1946–1976. 2000. The Aviation Hobby Shop.

External links
Fleet and code information
Timetable images

Defunct airlines of the United Kingdom
Companies based in Cardiff